Suzanne Hill (born 1943) is a Canadian artist.

Career
In 1999 Hill received the Strathbutler Award for New Brunswick artists. Hill's work is held in the collections of the New Brunswick Museum and the Beaverbrook Art Gallery.

References

1943 births
20th-century Canadian women artists
21st-century Canadian women artists
Artists from New Brunswick
Living people